Brian Agustín Nievas (born 28 April 1998) is an Argentine professional footballer who plays as a defensive midfielder for Patronato.

Career
Nievas joined Patronato's ranks from Club Diamantino at the age of seventeen. He made the breakthrough into first-team football in March 2019, featuring for the final thirteen minutes of a Copa Argentina round of sixty-four penalty shoot-out victory over Dock Sud on 13 March; having replaced Pablo Ledesma. Nievas was selected on the bench for a Primera División fixture with Defensa y Justicia on 17 March, though wouldn't come on during a 2–0 win. His next appearance didn't arrive until 29 November 2020, as the defensive midfielder played eighty-one minutes of an away defeat to Huracán in the Copa de la Liga Profesional.

In January 2022, Nievas joined Ecuadorian club C.S.D. Macará on a one-year loan deal. However, at the end of May 2022 it was confirmed, that Nievas would return from the loan spell before time.

Career statistics
.

Notes

References

External links

1998 births
Living people
People from Diamante Department
Argentine footballers
Argentine expatriate footballers
Association football midfielders
Argentine Primera División players
Ecuadorian Serie A players
Club Atlético Patronato footballers
Argentine expatriate sportspeople in Ecuador
Expatriate footballers in Ecuador
Sportspeople from Entre Ríos Province